Hintz is an unincorporated community located in the town of Underhill, Oconto County, Wisconsin, United States. Hintz was named for Robert Hintz, the community's first postmaster.

References

Unincorporated communities in Oconto County, Wisconsin
Unincorporated communities in Wisconsin
Green Bay metropolitan area